The 2018 Nicky Rackard Cup was the 14th staging of the Nicky Rackard Cup hurling championship since its establishment by the Gaelic Athletic Association in 2005. It was the fourth tier of senior inter-county hurling as of 2018.

The competition began on Saturday 12 May 2018 and ended on Saturday 23 June 2018.

Derry were the 2017 champions, beating Armagh in the final. Both teams were promoted to the 2018 Christy Ring Cup as a result of the restructuring of the All-Ireland Senior Hurling Championship. Following the withdrawal of the Fingal team from the competition in 2017, there was no relegation from the 2017 competition and Warwickshire were promoted from the 2017 Lory Meagher Cup.

Format

Beginning in 2018, the Nicky Rackard Cup changed to an initial stage of two groups, which in 2018 consisted of one group of four teams and one group of three teams. Previously it was a double elimination tournament.

The top two teams from both groups advance to the knockout semi-finals. The winners of the 2018 Nicky Rackard Cup are promoted to the 2019 Christy Ring Cup. Two teams will be relegated from the 2018 Christy Ring Cup to the 2019 Nicky Rackard Cup to make the 2019 completion into two groups of four teams.

The bottom teams from each group playoff in a relegation match with the losers playing in the 2019 Lory Meagher Cup. They are replaced by the winners of the 2018 Lory Meagher Cup.

Group stage

Group 1

Group 1 Table

{| class="wikitable" style="text-align:center"
!width=20|
!width=150 style="text-align:left;"|Team
!width=20|
!width=20|
!width=20|
!width=20|
!width=30|
!width=50|
!width=20|
!width=20|
|- style="background:#ccffcc"
|1||align=left| Warwickshire (Q)||3||3||0||0||68||52||16||6
|- style="background:#ccffcc"
|2||align=left| Monaghan (Q)||3||1||1||1||69||58||11||3
|-  
|3||align=left| Longford ||3||1||0||2||48||59||-11||2
|- style="background:#ffcccc"
|4||align=left| Louth ||3||0||1||2||49||65||-16||1

|}

Group 1 Rounds 1 to 3

Group 1 Round 1

Group 1 Round 2

Group 1 Round 3

Group 2

Group 2 Table

{| class="wikitable" style="text-align:center"
!width=20|
!width=150 style="text-align:left;"|Team
!width=20|
!width=20|
!width=20|
!width=20|
!width=30|
!width=50|
!width=20|
!width=20|
|- style="background:#ccffcc"
|1||align=left| Donegal (Q)||2||2||0||0||63||29||34||4
|- style="background:#ccffcc"
|2||align=left| Tyrone (Q)||2||1||0||1||46||49||-3||2
|- style="background:#ffcccc" 
|3||align=left| Leitrim ||2||0||0||2||34||65||-31||0
|}

Group 2 Rounds 1 to 3

Group 2 Round 1

Group 2 Round 2

Group 2 Round 3

Knockout stage

Bracket

Semi-finals

The Group 1 winners play the Group 2 runners-up and the Group 2 winners play the Group 1 runners-up.

Cup Final

The semi-final winners met in the Nicky Rackard Cup final at Croke Park with the winners being promoted to the Christy Ring Cup for 2019.

Relegation playoff

The bottom teams in each group - the fourth placed team in group 1 and the third placed team in group 2 - meet in a relegation playoff. The winners remain in the Nicky Rackard Cup for 2019, while the losers are relegated to the 2019 Lory Meagher Cup.

 Leitrim are relegated to the 2019 Lory Meagher Cup. Louth will remain in the 2019 Nicky Rackard Cup

Scoring statistics

Top scorers overall

Top scorers in a single game

References

Nicky Rackard Cup
Nicky Rackard Cup